Quikjet Cargo Airlines Pvt. Ltd., branded as Quikjet Airlines, is an all-cargo airline based in Bangalore, India.

History
The airline was formed in 2007, promoted by AFL Pvt Ltd. Switzerland-based Farnair picked up a 36.2% stake in the airline in February 2012, making AFL the second-largest shareholder with 20.8% stake in the carrier. QuikJet had operated one of Farnair's twelve ATR 72-200Fs until March 2013 before temporarily closing shop in anticipation of a B737-400F. In May 2015, India's Foreign Investment Promotion Board (FIPB)  approved Farnair's plan to incrementally increase its stake in Quikjet Cargo Airlines from 50.93% to 72.59% involving a minimum total foreign direct investment of Rs. 14.4 crores. Quickjet launched scheduled domestic cargo services using 737-400F aircraft. The airline started scheduled cargo flights on 16 February 2016 using a Boeing 737.

In August 2022, Quickjet Cargo took delivery of its first Boeing 737-800F with another one on order. Quickjet Cargo will be operating for Amazon Air in India.

Destinations
As of December 2022, Quikjet Cargo does not operate any flights.

Fleet
As of February 2023, Quikjet Cargo operates the following aircraft:

See also
 List of airlines of India

References

External links 

 

Cargo airlines of India
Airlines established in 2007
Indian companies established in 2007
2007 establishments in Karnataka
Companies based in Bangalore